Instant-runoff voting (IRV) is a voting method used in single-seat elections with more than two candidates. Instead of voting only for a single candidate, voters in IRV elections can rank the candidates in order of preference. Ballots are initially counted for each elector's top choice, losing candidates are eliminated, and ballots for losing candidates are redistributed until one candidate is the top remaining choice of a majority of the voters. When the field is reduced to two, it has become an "instant runoff" that allows a comparison of the top two candidates head-to-head.

IRV more commonly known outside the US as the alternative vote or preferential voting, was devised around 1870 by the US architect W. R. Ware. Today it is in use at a national level to elect the Australian House of Representatives, the National Parliament of Papua New Guinea, the President of Ireland and President of India. In Australia it is also used for elections to the legislative assemblies (lower houses) of all states and territories except Tasmania and the Australian Capital Territory, and for the Tasmanian Legislative Council (upper house).

IRV is also used a number of municipal elections in Australia, the United States, United Kingdom and New Zealand. Because of its relationship to the Single Transferable Vote (STV) system, IRV is used for by-elections and elections with only a single winner (such as elections for the President of Ireland) in some jurisdictions that use STV for ordinary parliamentary elections, such as the Republic of Ireland and Scotland.

IRV is known by different names in the various countries in which it is used. It is also known as the 'Alternative Vote', 'Ranked Choice Voting', and 'Preferential Voting', although IRV is only one of many ranked (or preferential) voting systems.

History 

This method was considered by Condorcet as early as 1788, though only to condemn it, for its ability to eliminate a candidate preferred by a majority of voters.  

Instant-runoff voting is based on the Single Transferable Vote electoral system, developed by Hill in 1819, Hare in 1857, and Andrae in 1855. Unlike IRV, the Single Transferable Vote was designed as a form of proportional representation involving multi-seat constituencies, and today STV is used in a number of countries, including Australia, the Republic of Ireland and Malta.

It is also known as Ware's method, after William Robert Ware, the founder of the schools of architecture at the Massachusetts Institute of Technology (MIT) and Columbia University, who, while describing the Single Transferable Vote system in 1871, mentioned that it could also be used for single-winner elections. IRV was adopted for the Australian House of Representatives in 1918 and has been used to elect the President of Ireland since the office came into being in 1937. It was introduced in Fiji in 1999 and in Papua New Guinea in 2007.

Use by country

Australia

IRV (in Australia called preferential voting) was introduced for House of Representatives elections in Australia after the Swan by-election in October 1918, when the conservative Country Party, representing small farmers, split the non-Labor vote in conservative country areas, allowing Labor candidates to win on a first-past-the-post vote then in place. The conservative Nationalist government of Billy Hughes introduced preferential voting to enable the Coalition parties to field candidates in the same electorates without putting Coalition seats at risk.  It was first used at the Corangamite by-election on 14 December 1918, and nationwide at the 1919 election. Preferential voting continued to benefit the Coalition until the 1990 election, when for the first time the Labor Bob Hawke government obtained a net benefit from preferential voting.

Ballot papers are marked with the order of preferences: 1, 2, 3, etc. Counting of the ballot papers proceeds and when no candidate receives more than 50% of the first preference vote (candidates with a number one), the candidate with the fewest first preference votes is eliminated and that candidate's votes are distributed to the remaining candidates. The process continues until a candidate accumulates 50% plus one vote, or a simple majority. Counting will continue to finality, which results in what is referred to as the two-party preferred vote, which expresses the electorate's voting preference equivalent to a 2-person election of the two most popular candidates. Most council (local government) elections also use the method, as do the lower house elections of four states (New South Wales, South Australia, Victoria and Western Australia), the sole house of one state (Queensland) and one territory (the Northern Territory) and the upper house of one other state (Tasmania).

A study of the 2007 federal election found that every House of Representatives electorate had at least four candidates, and the average number of candidates was seven. 76 candidates depended on preferences to win, which represented more than half of the 150 winners.

Preferential voting is used for most state and local elections in Australia, but sometimes with optional preferential voting where voters are allowed to limit their number of rankings. The Australian Senate, the upper houses of four states (New South Wales, South Australia, Victoria and Western Australia), the lower house of one state (Tasmania) and the sole house of the Australian Capital Territory, use the single transferable vote.

Canada 
Under the name 'preferential' or 'elimination ballot' or alternative vote, IRV was used in the British Columbia's general elections of 1952 and 1953. IRV was brought in by the governing coalition consisting of the Liberal and Conservative parties to gain advantage over the rising CCF. But the election did not work out as the coalition partners expected.

Provincially, British Columbia used a mixture of voting methods to elect their members of the Legislative Assembly (MLAs): single-member districts using first-past-the-post and multi-member districts using through block voting. Elections in BC from the province's creation until the 1990 election were held under a mix of multi-member and single-member districts, with district types often being changed back and forth from one election to the next. Through almost all of BC's history, seats were filled by plurality elections. The only exceptions were the 1952 and 1953 elections where Instant-runoff voting was used.

Through the 1940s, the province was governed by a coalition of the British Columbia Conservative Party (the Conservatives) and the British Columbia Liberal Party (the Liberals). Neither party had sufficient electoral support to form government alone, and the coalition allowed these parties to keep the left-of-centre Co-operative Commonwealth Federation (CCF) out of power.

By the 1950s, the coalition had begun to fall apart, resulting in the Conservatives and Liberals having to run for office separately under their own party banners. However, to try to prevent the CCF from being elected, one of the last acts of the coalition government was to introduce the alternative voting system (known today in the US as instant-runoff voting), which was implemented for the 1952 general election. IRV was brought in even in multi-seat districts by the innovation that each seat would be filled by a separate contests, two or even three separate ballots and contests in a district. 

In each contest in a district, rather than voting for one candidate by marking an "X" on the ballot, an elector ranked the candidates running in the contest by placing numbers next to their names on the ballot. (They could rank as few or as many candidates as they desired.) The candidate marked with a 1 received the vote in the first count. In the first count, if a candidate received a majority of first preferences marked by voters, that candidate was declared elected with no vote transfers being conducted. If not, the candidate with the fewest votes was dropped and the candidate's ballots were re-allocated to the remaining candidates based on the second choices marked on the ballots. This procedure was repeated again and again if necessary until a candidate received a majority of votes.

The result of using this voting method (plus completely different voting behavior by many BC voters) was the unexpected  election of enough MLAs of the British Columbia Social Credit Party (the SoCreds), to form a minority government, with the CCF forming the official opposition. The BC Liberals were reduced to six members in the Legislature. The Conservatives (who changed their party name to the "Progressive Conservatives" in tandem with their federal counterparts) were reduced to four.

The SoCred minority government lasted only nine months before losing a vote in the Legislature and an election having to be called. Alternative voting was again employed in this general election. The result this time was a SoCred majority. 

After this second IRV election, the SoCreds abolished the preferential voting system and returned the province to the province's traditional mixed system of block voting in multiple-member constituencies and FPTP contests in single-member districts. The change-back benefited the government party by creating large numbers of wasted votes and a wide possibility for gerrymandering. Finally in the 1980s, this unfair system was discarded due to wide criticism, and the province adopted a consistent system of FPTP in single-seat districts. In the next election many CCF supporters chose the relatively unknown Social Credit Party, a minor party that had never held any seats in the British Columbia legislature, as their second choice. The Social Credit Party achieved an upset victory in the 1952 election, winning 19 seats in the 48-member legislature to 18 for the CCF, 6 for the Liberals and 4 for the Conservatives. The Socreds formed a short-lived minority government until the 1953 election, in which they won a majority of seats (28 of 48). After the 1953 election, the Liberal and renamed Progressive Conservative Parties were reduced to third parties in the province, and first-past-the-post was reinstated by the government.

IRV was also used for provincial elections in Alberta (1926–1955 in rural districts), and Manitoba (1927–1953) outside Winnipeg (excluding St. Boniface in 1949 and 1953). IRV was also used in provincial by-elections in these two provinces between 1924 and 1955.

IRV has never been used for federal elections. 

IRV was used to elect mayors in city elections when STV was used to elect city councillors. STV/IRV was used in 20 Canadian cites during the 20th Century.

IRV is used for certain party and private elections in Canada, including such large-scale elections at the Canadian Wheat Board, the 2006 Progressive Conservative Association of Alberta leadership election, where it has generated high turnout, and the 2011 British Columbia Liberal Party leadership election. The Liberal Party of Canada had adopted IRV with a national primary for its leadership elections.

In 2014, the Province of Ontario announced that municipalities would have the option to use IRV for local elections starting in 2018, and authorizing legislation was passed in 2016. London, Ontario became the first city to use ranked choice voting in 2018, and Cambridge and Kingston will join in 2022.

Instant-runoff voting is used in whole or in part to elect the leaders of the three largest federal political parties in Canada: the Liberal Party of Canada, the Conservative Party of Canada, and the New Democratic Party, albeit the New Democratic Party uses a mixture of IRV and exhaustive voting, allowing each member to choose one format or the other for their vote (as was used in their 2017 leadership election). In 2013, members of the Liberal Party of Canada elected Justin Trudeau as party leader through IRV in a national leadership election. The Conservative Party used IRV (where each of the party's 338 riding associations are weighted equally, regardless of how many members voted in each riding) to elect Erin O'Toole as party leader in 2020, Andrew Scheer in 2017, and Stephen Harper in 2004.

The Green Party of Canada also elects their leader through IRV.

Czech Republic 
IRV is used to elect leaders of the Green party.

Hong Kong
IRV is used to elect a small number of functional constituencies of the Legislative Council of Hong Kong, all of which have very small electorates.

India 
IRV is used in numerous electoral college environments, including the election of the President of India by the members of the Parliament of India and of the Vidhan Sabhas – the state legislatures. The election is held with IRV, which in the Indian Constitution (Article 55) is called single transferable vote.

Ireland
All public elections in the Republic of Ireland are described as using the single transferable vote, or "proportional representation by the means of the single transferable vote". In the case of single-winner elections STV reduces to IRV, although neither "instant runoff voting" nor "alternative vote" is a commonly used name in Ireland. All constituencies for Dáil, Seanad, MEP, and local elections are multi-member (STV). Single-winner (IRV) elections include: all presidential elections; single-vacancy 
Dáil by-elections; all Seanad by-elections; and three of the seven Údarás na Gaeltachta constituencies (1999–2012). The Dáil elects a Taoiseach (prime minister) by majority motion, but since 2016 elects its Ceann Comhairle (speaker) by IRV ballot. Local authorities elect their  (chairperson) by exhaustive ballot, "non-instant" runoff voting. The Local Government Act 2019 provides for steps towards introducing directly elected mayors; the government's detailed proposal document implies IRV would be used to elect them. Referendums in Ireland currently require a binary yes/no question; in 2018 the Citizens' Assembly recommended allowing multiple-choice referendums with the result determined via IRV.

While most elections in the Republic of Ireland use the single transferable vote (STV), in single-winner contests this reduces to IRV. This is the case in all Presidential elections and Seanad panel by-elections, and most Dáil by-elections In the rare event of multiple simultaneous vacancies in a single Dáil constituency, a single STV by-election may be held; for Seanad panels, multiple IRV by-elections are held.

New Zealand
The single transferable vote (STV), a multi-seat variation of IRV, is used for all district health board elections. Starting in 2004, several New Zealand cities and local authorities began to use STV for their elections—including the nation's second largest city and capital Wellington and its fifth largest city Dunedin  Where electing a mayor directly, these cities used instant runoff voting. In 2007, for example, Wellington's mayor Kerry Prendergast defeated her 10 rivals on the 9th round of counting. Other contested IRV races have included the 2010 Dunedin mayoral election and 2010 Wellington City mayoral election.

In the 1992 referendum on the voting method to elect members of the New Zealand House of Representatives, the alternative vote was one of the four alternative methods available (alongside MMP, STV and SM). It came third of the alternative methods (ahead of SM) with 6.6% of the vote. IRV, under the name preferential vote, was one of the four alternative methods choices presented in the 2011 voting method referendum, but the referendum resulted in New Zealanders choosing to keep their proportional method of representation instead, while IRV came last with 8.34%.

As of September 2013, seven authorities are elected with STV: Dunedin City Council, Greater Wellington Council, Kapiti Coast District Council, Marlborough District Council, Palmerston North City Council, Porirua City Council, and Wellington City Council. Wellington upheld STV in a 2008 ballot measure. Multi-member wards in these cities use STV.

The New Zealand Labour Party in 2013 was using IRV to pick a new party leader.

IRV (again under the name preferential vote) was used on the initial ballot of the 2015–2016 New Zealand flag referendums for voters to rank their preferences about the five new flag options.

Papua New Guinea
A form of IRV has been used to elect members of parliament since last plurality voting election in 2002. Called "limited preferential voting" because voters are limited to ranking three candidates, the system has been credited with reducing election violence in a highly fractured political system. IRV has been used since 2003 for the national parliament election, where voters are limited to ranking three candidates.

United Kingdom

IRV is currently used in the United Kingdom for by-elections to the Northern Ireland Assembly and to local assemblies in Scotland, both of which use the single transferable vote method of proportional representation in regularly scheduled elections. It is used in its contingent vote form (also called the supplementary vote), for all direct elections for mayor in England, including in London. It is used to fill vacancies within the House of Lords, to elect the leaders of the Liberal Democrats and the Labour Party and for many private elections, including for Chancellor of Oxford University  and rectorial elections at the University of Edinburgh. IRV was the electoral method available to select a replacement MEP by election for the Northern Ireland constituency of the European parliament, however now a party can co-opt a replacement without the need for a by-election.

IRV has been debated vigorously in the country since the early 20th century. In 1917, for example, the Speaker's Conference advocated the adoption of IRV for 358 of the 569 constituencies in the UK, and STV for the rest; its intention was that STV would be used in densely populated urban areas but, in order to keep constituencies from being too large, IRV would be used in more sparsely populated rural areas. Although the House of Commons voted in favour of the proposals five times, the House of Lords rejected it until the nationwide effort was ultimately abandoned in parliament.

In 1921 the Government of Ireland Act established two home rule parliaments in Ireland–the Parliament of Northern Ireland and the Parliament of Southern Ireland–and while STV was used for regular elections to these bodies, IRV was used for by-elections. This combination of IRV and STV has been used in what is now the Republic of Ireland ever since. The Northern Ireland Parliament continued to use the combination until the late 1920s when it switched to the 'first past the post' plurality system. However, STV for regular elections, and IRV for by-elections, has been reintroduced and used there to elect devolved assemblies since the 1970s.

IRV is usually referred to in the UK as the 'Alternative Vote' or 'AV'. In 1998 the Jenkins Commission, charged by the government with suggesting an alternative system to plurality, devised a new system called the Alternative Vote Plus (AV+) for elections to the British Parliament. This involved a combination of party-list proportional representation and single seat constituencies elected under IRV. However no action has been taken on the Commission's report.

In March 2009 the government announced that it would run an inquiry into the use of IRV at future general elections, and in February 2010 the House of Commons voted to hold a national referendum on AV. The government's term expired before this legislation was approved, but in July 2010, newly elected Deputy Prime Minister Nick Clegg announced a referendum on AV, subsequently held on 5 May 2011. The proposal would have affected the way in which Members of Parliament are elected to the British House of Commons at Westminster. It was only the second national referendum ever to be held within the United Kingdom and the result of the referendum was a decisive rejection of the adoption of the alternative vote by a margin of 67.9% to 32.1% of voters on a national turnout of 42%.

United States

Since 1912, IRV has been adopted and repealed in various United States jurisdictions.

Between 1912 and 1930, limited forms of RCV (typically with only two rankings) were implemented, with 24 cities using proportional RCV before repeal in some areas (Florida, Indiana, Maryland, Minnesota, and Wisconsin) Proportional RCV has been used continuously in Cambridge, Massachusetts since 1941. 

Since 2002, IRV has been adopted by more than a dozen cities, with some adoptions pending implementation.

Jurisdictions that have implemented and then repealed IRV include Ann Arbor, Michigan (1974–1976); Pierce County, Washington (2006–2009); Burlington, Vermont (2005–2010); Aspen, Colorado (2007–2010); and in North Carolina (2006–2013).

As of October 2022, American cities and counties currently using IRV to elect at least one office included New York City, New York; Minneapolis, Minnesota; Oakland, California; St. Paul, Minnesota; Bloomington, Minnesota; Bloomington, Minnesota; St. Louis Park, Minnesota; San Francisco, California; Takoma Park, Maryland; Berkeley, California; San Leandro, California; Benton County, Oregon; Corvallis, Oregon; Portland, Maine; Cambridge, Massachusetts; Easthampton, Massachusetts; Eastpointe, Michigan; Santa Fe, New Mexico; Las Cruces, New Mexico; Basalt, Colorado; and Telluride, Colorado.

San Francisco's system of IRV was challenged in federal court, but a unanimous panel of the US Court of Appeals for the 9th Circuit upheld San Francisco's IRV law, finding that the plaintiff failed to establish that the City's chosen electoral system was unconstitutional.

Private organizations in the U.S. that use IRV include the Hugo Awards for science fiction, the Academy of Motion Picture Arts and Sciences in selection of the Oscar for Best Picture, and more than fifty colleges and universities for student elections.

Maine became the first U.S. state to approve IRV for its primary and general elections for governor, U.S. Senate, U.S. House and state legislature in a 2016 referendum. The state supreme court ruled this method of voting was unconstitutional for state general elections, but this ruling did not affect primary and federal elections.  The state legislature attempted to repeal IRV for all elections unless the state constitution was amended, but this repeal was put on hold by a people's veto petition. The June 2018 primary election both used IRV to determine party candidates and Maine Question 1 passed, which blocked the repeal. Democrat Jared Golden became the first congressional candidate in the United States to win a general election as a result of IRV, defeating incumbent Republican Bruce Poliquin in second round balloting for Maine's 2nd congressional district in 2018. In the future, IRV will also be used for primary elections for federal elections and only primary elections for state offices. A bill passed in August 2019 will make Maine the first state to use IRV in presidential general elections in 2020, but use in presidential primaries has been delayed until 2024. The state of Alaska adopted RCV in 2020 with first use in 2022. It is used for all state and federal general elections. All uses except presidential election use the “top four” form, with an open primary advancing 4 candidates to the general election with RCV.

Six states planned to use RCV in the 2020 Democratic Party presidential primaries: Alaska, Hawaii, Kansas, and Wyoming for all voters; Iowa and Nevada for absentee voters. Rather than eliminating candidates until a single winner is chosen, voters' choices would be reallocated until all remaining candidates have at least 15%, the threshold to receive delegates to the convention.

Elections conducted under IRV

Countries and regions

Federal provinces or states

Municipalities

See also
History and use of the Single Transferable Vote
Irish presidential election

Footnotes

References 

Instant-runoff voting
History and use of electoral systems